The University of Dar es Salaam (UDSM) is a public university located in Kinondoni District of Dar es Salaam, Tanzania. It was established in 1961 as an affiliate college of the University of London. The university became an affiliate of the University of East Africa (UEA) in 1963, shortly after Tanzania gained its independence from the United Kingdom. In 1970, UEA split into three independent universities: Makerere University in Uganda, the University of Nairobi in Kenya, and the University of Dar es Salaam.

Rankings

In 2012, the University Ranking by Academic Performance Center ranked the University of Dar es Salaam as the 1,618th best university in the world (out of 2,000 ranked universities).

In 2013, AcademyRank ranked the university as the 2,965th best university worldwide (out of 9,803 ranked universities) but the best of the 16 ranked in Tanzania, with the Sokoine University of Agriculture in second place.

In 2012, the Scimago Institutions Rankings placed the university in 3,021st place worldwide (out of 3,290 ranked institutions), 57th in Africa, and second in Tanzania behind the Muhimbili University of Health and Allied Sciences. This ranking is based on the total number of documents published in scholarly journals indexed in the Scopus database by Elsevier. Based solely on the university's "excellence rate", the university was ranked 16th out of 62 universities in Africa in 2011. This rate "indicates which percentage of an institution's scientific output is included into the set formed by the 10% of the most cited papers in their respective scientific fields. It is a measure of high quality output of research institutions".

In July 2012, Webometrics ranked the university as the 1,977th best university worldwide based on its web presence (an assessment of the scholarly contents, visibility, and impact of the university on the web) but the best in Tanzania, with the Hubert Kairuki Memorial University far behind in second place.

Campuses

The university has five campuses in and around the city of Dar es Salaam and operates academically through ten faculties, some of which are exclusive to specific campuses. For example, the College of Engineering and Technology campus houses the faculties of mechanical and chemical engineering, electrical and computer systems engineering, and civil engineering and the built environment. The faculty of humanities and social sciences is active in the Mkwawa University College of Education campus and also in the Dar es Salaam University College of Education.

The university, as of 2015, started offering a Doctor of Medicine program, which did not exist since its medical college, the Muhimbili College of Health Sciences (MUCHS), became a full-fledged university in 2007. The newly established college started as the University of Dar es Salaam School of Health Sciences (SOHS) at the Mlimani campus, then in 2017 relocated to Mbeya region as Mbeya College of Health and Allied Sciences (MCHAS) within the grounds of Mbeya zonal referral hospital.

The main campus, called Mlimani (meaning "on the hill" in Swahili), is located 13 kilometres west of Dar es Salaam city centre and is home to the basic faculties of education, arts and social science, and science. In addition, four specialist faculties – informatics and virtual education, law, commerce and management, and aquatic science and technology – have been established there. The Institute of Journalism and Mass Communication provides the university with its fifth campus.

The Nkrumah Hall, a building on the Mlimani campus, is featured on the back of the Tanzanian 500 shilling bill.

Notable alumni

Francis K. Butagira, Ugandan diplomat
 Majaliwa Kassim Majaliwa, prime minister of Tanzania, November 2015 – present
Zakia Meghji, former Minister of Finance Tanzania
John Garang, former Vice President of Sudan
Joseph Obgeb Jimmy, Namibian diplomat
Laurent-Désiré Kabila, former President of DRC
Donald Kaberuka, President of the African Development Bank
Eriya Kategaya, former First Deputy Prime Minister of Uganda
Jakaya Kikwete, former President of Tanzania
Edward Lowassa, former Prime Minister of Tanzania
John Magufuli, former President of Tanzania
Patricia McFadden, Swazi author, and African radical feminist
Bernard Membe, Tanzanian Foreign Minister
Asha-Rose Migiro, former Deputy Secretary-General of the UN
Joyce Ndalichako Minister of Education, Vocational training and Technology, Former Executive Secretary of NECTA
Gertrude Mongella, former President of the Pan-African Parliament
Yoweri Museveni, President of Uganda
Willy Mutunga, Chief Justice of Kenya
Mizengo Pinda, former Prime Minister of Tanzania
Irene Tarimo, researcher, academician and lecturer at OUT
Juma Ngasongwa, former Tanzanian Trade Minister
Halima Mdee, Member of parliament for CHADEMA. 
Joseph Warioba, former Vice President and Prime Minister of Tanzania
Zitto Kabwe, ACT Wazalendo leader
Jokate Mwegelo, actress, District Commissioner of Kisarawe
Seif Sharif Hamad, Secretary General of the Civic United Front
Tundu Lissu, Tanzanian politician and former president Tanzania Law Society
Tolly Mbwette, Tanzanian Engineer, educationist and former Vice Chancellor of OUT
Catherine Ruge, Member of parliament for CHADEMA.

Notable faculty

 Giovanni Arrighi, Lecturer in Economics from 1967 to 1969
 Molly Mahood, Professor of English from 1954 to 1963
 Milton Santos, Professor of Geography from 1974 to 1976
 Walter Rodney, Guyanese scholar and politician
 Yash Tandon, former head of the South Centre (previously, the South Commission)

Gallery

References

External links
 
 Campus Map

 
Public universities in Tanzania
Universities in Dar es Salaam
Educational institutions established in 1970
Forestry education
Association of African Universities
1970 establishments in Tanzania